Carpool is a British television spin-off of the web series of the same name. It is presented by English actor and comedian Robert Llewellyn. In each episode he interviews a guest while giving them a ride in his Toyota Prius. The guests are mainly comedians/comedic actors that are well known in the UK. However, Llewellyn has also interviewed musical comedian Tim Minchin and magician Paul Daniels.

The show is filmed using high-definition cameras mounted within and outside the car. Llewellyn drives his guest to a destination of their choosing as they talk informally about various subjects. As Llewellyn is driving for the majority of the time it can be difficult to deal with technical problems, especially interference from mobile phones.

The show, based on the web format, is developed by RDF Contact, and fully funded by Toyota, who also sponsor the show. Carpool was first broadcast on Dave on 4 November 2010.
Carpool has been shortlisted for best content partnership in Broadcast Awards.
In an August, 2011 update of the web series, Llewellyn announced that the show would stay as a web-exclusive and that no more made-for-television episodes would be made.

Episodes

Commissioning
News of the TV version of Carpool first came at London Film and Comic Con in July 2009. Danny John-Jules, Llewellyn's Red Dwarf co-star, mentioned that RDF Contact (who produced Llewellyn's Scrapheap Challenge) had been commissioned by UKTV to produce Carpool for broadcast and that Llewellyn was shooting a number of episodes in high-definition.

On 30 June 2010 it was announced that the new shows would appear on the UKTV channel, Dave, as well as extended versions of the broadcast episodes appearing online on Llewellyn's YouTube page and on iTunes after broadcast, and that the format of the show will remain unchanged.

It is usually broadcast as an Easter Egg, hidden at the end of the last broadcast of the evening on Dave (at around 0240 hrs) and not mentioned in TV listings.

References

External links
Carpool on Dave

Watch full episodes of Carpool on the Dave website
Carpool channel on Youtube
Carpool official iPhone App
Twitterings – watch Carpool

2010 British television series debuts
2010s British television talk shows
2011 British television series endings
British television talk shows
Dave (TV channel) original programming